Ricardo Villa (October 23, 1873 Madrid – April 10, 1935 Madrid) was a Spanish composer. Among his compositions are two zarzuela, El Cristo de la Vega and Raimundo Lulio.

References

External links
 

1873 births
1935 deaths
Male opera composers
Musicians from Madrid
Spanish classical composers
Spanish male classical composers
Spanish opera composers